Alisa is a female given name, a version of Alice in used in Russia, Finland, Estonia and other countries. Notable people with the names Alisa and Alissa include:

Alisa

People
Alisa Agafonova (born 1991), Ukrainian former competitive ice dancer
Alisa Ahmann (born 1994), German fashion model
Alisa Aksyonova (born 1931), Russian museum director
Alisa Bellettini (1954–2016), American television producer
Alisa Bokulich, American philosopher of science
Alisa Buchinger (born 1992), Austrian karateka
Alisa Burras (born 1975), American former professional basketball player
Alisa Camplin (born 1974), Australian aerial skier
Alisa Childers (born 1975), American singer and songwriter
Alisa Chumachenko, Lithuanian entrepreneur
Alisa Craig (1922–2005), American novelist Charlotte MacLeod’s pen name
Alisa Drei (born 1978), Finnish former competitive figure skater
Alisa Durbrow (born 1988), Japanese model, actress, and singer
Alisa Efimova (born 1999), Finnish-Russian pair skater
Alisa Fedichkina (born 2002), Russian competitive figure skater
Alisa Freindlich (born 1934), Soviet and Russian actress
Alisa Galliamova (born 1972), Russian chess player
Alisa Ganieva (born 1985), Russian author and essayist
Alisa M. Goldstein, American genetic epidemiologist
Alisa Harvey (born 1965), American middle distance runner
Alisa Jakobi (born 1981), Estonian artist, actress, and graphic designer
Alisa Kajornchaiyakul (born 1966), Thai beauty pageant winner
Alisa Kano (born 1994), American group rhythmic gymnast
Alisa Kelli Wise (born 1962), American lawyer and judge
Alisa Kezheradze (1937–1996), American pianist and teacher
Alisa Khachatryan, Armenian professional footballer
Alisa Khaleyeva (born 1978), Azerbaijani former swimmer
Alisa Kireeva (born 1989), Ukrainian former competitive figure skater
Alisa Kirilyuk (born 1990), Russian sailor
Alisa Kleybanova (born 1989), Russian former tennis player
Alisa Kolosova (born 1987), Russian mezzo-soprano
Alisa Koonen (1889–1974), Russian and Soviet actress
Alisa Kozhikina (born 2003), Russian singer
Alisa Kresge (born 1985), American former basketball player and current coach
Alisa Krylova (born 1982), Russian supermodel and international journalist
Alisa Kwitney (born 1964), American writer
Alisa LaGamma, American art historian
Alisa Lepselter (born 1963), American film editor
Alisa Margolis (born 1975), Ukrainian artist
Alisa Marić (born 1970), Serbian chess player
Alisa Melekhina (born 1991), American chess player and ballerina
Alisa Mikonsaari (born 1993), Finnish figure skater
Alisa Mitskog, American politician
Alisa Mizuki (born 1976), Japanese actress, singer, and model
Alisa Mon (born 1964), Soviet and Russian pop singer
Alisa Ozhogina (born 2000), Russian-born Spanish synchro swimmer
Alisa Palmer, Canadian theater director and playwright
Alisa Persons, American writer and video filmmaker
Alisa Reyes (born 1981), American actress
Alisa Rukpinij (born 1995), Thai international footballer
Alisa Sadikova (born 2003), Russian prodigy classical harpist
Alisa Shevchenko (born 1984), Russian hacker and cybersecurity researcher
Alisa Solomon (born 1956), American writer, journalist, and editor
Alisa Spahić (born 1990), Bosnian footballer
Alisa Stomakhina (born 2002), Russian-born figure skater for Austria
Alisa Summers, American drag queen
Alisa Takigawa (born 1991), Japanese musician and singer-songwriter
Alisa Tishchenko (born 2004), Russian group rhythmic gymnast
Alisa Ueno (born 1989), Japanese singer, disk jockey, model, fashion designer, businessperson, and internet personality
Alisa Vainio (born 1997), Finnish long-distance runner
Alisa Valdes (born 1969), American author, journalist, and film producer
Alisa Van Oijen (born 1992), Austrian former professional racing cyclist
Alisa Vetterlein (born 1988), German former footballer
Alisa Walker, member of American country music band Redhead Express
Alisa Walton (born 1970), Canadian actress
Alisa Weilerstein (born 1982), American classical cellist
Alisa Wells (1927–1988), American photographer
Alisa Xayalith (born 1986), New Zealand musician
Alisa Zhambalova (born 1994), Russian cross-country skier

Fictional characters
Alisa Bannings, in the Japanese multimedia franchise Magical Girl Lyrical Nanoha
Alisa Bosconovitch, from the “Tekken” video game series
Alisa Jones, in the American web television series Jessica Jones
Alisa Selezneva, in Russian writer Kir Bulychev’s series of children’s science fiction books
Alisa Tager, or Cipher, from “X-Men” comics

Alissa
Alissa Anderegg (born 1994), American beauty pageant titleholder and Alzheimer’s activist
Alissa Bjerkhoel, American lawyer
Alissa Chavez, American inventor, entrepreneur, and engineer
Alissa Crans, American mathematician
Alissa Czisny (born 1987), American former competitive figure skater
Alissa Firsova (born 1986), Russian-British classical composer, pianist, and conductor
Alissa Golob, Canadian anti-abortion and women’s rights activist
Alissa J. Rubin, American journalist and writer
Alissa Johnson (born 1987), American ski jumper
Alissa Jordaan (born 2003), Australian Paralympic athlete
Alissa Jung (born 1981), German actress and physician
Alissa Kallinikou (born 1985), Cypriot sprinter
Alissa Keny-Guyer (born 1959), American politician
Alissa M. Weaver, American oncologist
Alissa Moreno, American singer, songwriter, musician, and actress
Alissa Musto, American singer, pianist, and songwriter
Alissa Nutting, American author and creative writing professor
Alissa Quart (born 1972), American nonfiction writer, critic, journalist, editor, and poet
Alissa St Laurent (born 1984), Canadian ultramarathon runner
Alissa Thomas-Newborn, American Orthodox Jewish spiritual leader
Alissa Walser (born 1961), German writer, translator, and artist
Alissa White-Gluz (born 1985), Canadian singer
Alissa Wykes (born 1967/1968), American former football player
Alissa Yagi (born 1995), Japanese actress and model
Alissa York (born 1970), Canadian writer

See also
 
 Alyssa (disambiguation)
 Ailsa (disambiguation)
 Arisa (disambiguation)

References 

Finnish feminine given names